

Heahmund was a medieval Bishop of Sherborne.

Heahmund was consecrated in 867 or 868. He died at the Battle of Meretun in 871. As his death is assigned to 22 March in the English calendar of saints the battle and his death can be dated 22 March 871. He was buried at Keynsham in Somerset.

Heahmund is venerated as a saint in the Eastern Orthodox Church and Roman Catholic Church.

Citations

References

External links
 

Bishops of Sherborne (ancient)
871 deaths
9th-century English bishops
Year of birth unknown
9th-century Christian saints